Events from the year 1305 in Ireland.

Incumbent
 Lord: Edward I

Events
 Carlingford Abbey was founded by the Dominican Order

Births

Deaths